The 1998 Men's Floorball Championships were the second men's Floorball World Championships. It was held in May 1998 in the Czech Republic, and won by Sweden.

Championship results

Preliminary round

Group A

Group B

Placement round

7th Place match

5th Place match

Playoffs

Semi-finals

Bronze medal match

Championship match

Leading scorers

Awards & All-Star team
Goalkeeper:  Mark Wolf
Defense:     Klas Karlsson,  Jan-Erik Vaara
Forward:     Mika Kohonen,  Thomas Engel,  Magnus Augustsson
Most Valuable Player (MVP):  Martin Olofsson

Ranking 

Official 1998 A-Division Rankings according to the IFF

External links 
Tournament Statistics

Floorball Championships
Mens World Floorball Championships, 1998
International floorball competitions hosted by the Czech Republic
Floorball World Championships
Sports competitions in Prague
May 1998 sports events in Europe
1990s in Prague